Giovanni Mincio may also refer to antipope Benedict X

Giovanni Minio or Mincio, of Morrovalle or Murrovale (died August 1312) was an Italian Franciscan who became Minister General of the Order of Friars Minor,  cardinal-bishop of Porto (1302), Protector of the Order of Friars Minors (1307) and dean of the Sacred College of Cardinals (1311).

According to Giorgio Vasari, it was Mincio who commissioned Giotto for his frescoes of Francis of Assisi.

Notes

Deans of the College of Cardinals
14th-century Italian cardinals
Cardinal-bishops of Porto
Italian Franciscans
1312 deaths
Year of birth unknown
Ministers General of the Order of Friars Minor